Consoweld or Consoweld Laminated Plastic is a melamine impregnated paper product that was produced by the Consolidated Papers, Inc. of Wisconsin Rapids. It was originally developed during WWII for use in aircraft. In 1985, Consoweld was sold off to LOF Plastics.

Uses
Consoweld, in common with similar products had a wide variety of uses.  It was used in aircraft construction, house building and electrical applications.  The main use, however was as a worktop or to a lesser extent as a decorative finish for other domestic surfaces.

Consoweld advertisements often stressed commercial  use, for example the Hoffman House Restaurant in Madison was subject of a 1967 advertisement.

References

External links
 http://www.travelwisconsin.com/history-heritage/wisconsin-river-papermaking-museum-193114

Wood County, Wisconsin